The Violence Against Persons (Prohibition) Act 2015 (also known as VAPP Act) is a law enacted by the National Assembly (Nigeria) and was assented to become law by President Goodluck Ebele Jonathan on 2015. The goal of the Act is to "eliminate violence in private and public life, prohibit all forms of violence against persons and to provide maximum protection and effective remedies for victims and punishment of offenders; and for related matters".  The VAPP Act was enacted as a result of many gender-based violence and human right abuse happening in Nigeria, including rape, maiming of spouse, forceful ejection from home, forced isolation, acid bath, and killing.

History 
The bill for Violence Against Persons Prohibition (VAPP) was enacted in 2013 and passed by the House of Representatives (Nigeria) on May 14, 2015 and passed by the Senate of Nigeria May 14, 2015. The two legislative houses completed all the processes and transmitted the bill for assent to the President of the Federal Republic of Nigeria. The Nigerian President Goodluck Ebele Jonathan signed the bill on May 28, 2015; according to the Nigerian constitution, the bill automatically became an Act and law which takes effect immediately.

Provisions 
The provisions of the VAPP Act are divided into parts as follows:

Part I - Offences 
The Part I of the Act has twenty six sub-sections which explained a number of offences including: definition of rape, inflicting physical injury on a person, coercion, wilfully placing a person in fear of physical injury, offensive conduct, prohibition of female circumcision or genital mutilation, frustrating investigation, wilfully making false statements, forceful ejection from home, depriving a person of his or her liberty, damage to property with intent to cause distress, forced financial dependence or economic abuse, forced isolation or separation from family and friends, emotional- verbal and psychological abuse, harmful widowhood practices, abandonment of spouse, children and other dependents with sustenance; stalking, intimidation, spousal battery, harmful traditional practices, attack with harmful substance, political violence, violence by state actors, incest schedule, and indecent exposure.

Part II - Jurisdiction of the Court 
Part II of the Act explains the extent of the court and the official power to make legal decisions and judgements on the offences. The jurisdiction includes the following: application for protection order, consideration of application, issuing of protection order, court's powers in respect of protection order, powers of police, warrant of arrest upon issuing of protection order, variation or setting aside of protection order, and discharge.

Part III- Service Providers 
Part III of this Act explains that no person shall information that may reveal identity of people involved in proceedings. This sub-section includes prohibition of publication of certain information, registration and power of service providers, protection of officers, coordinator for prevention of domestic violence and dangerous sexual offenders.

Part IV - Regulatory Body 
This part explains that National Agency for the Prohibition of Trafficking in Persons is the regulatory body mandated to administer the provisions of the VAPP Act.

Part V- Consequential Amendment 
This sub-section posits that any offence committed or court proceedings that is ongoing with other laws of the land for a violence before the passage of this Act, shall as continue with the enforcement of the VAPP act.

Part VI - Interpretation 
The part VI is the last sub-section of the Act and it provided interpretations to so many terms such abandonment of women, children and other persons, accredited service provider, civil proceedings, court, domestic relationship, dangerous weapon, and many other terms in the Act.

Domestication of VAPP Act in States 
As at March 2022, Partners West Africa Nigeria reported that of the 36 states of Nigeria, only 19 states and the Federal Capital Territory (Nigeria) have domesticated the Violence Against Persons (Prohibition) Act 2015 and only 5 states House of Assembly has  passed the VAPP Act. The following states have domesticated the VAPP Act:

Controversy 

Feminist groups and non-governmental organisations working in women issues have stated that women and children are at danger in states where the VAPP Act has not been passed. Early marriage and other cultural issues have also been named an impediment to passage and assent of the VAPP Act in many northern states.

References 

Human rights in Nigeria
Violence in Nigeria
Human Rights Watch
Law of Nigeria